The Boston Public Garden Foot Bridge is a pedestrian bridge crossing the lagoon in Boston Public Garden, in Boston, Massachusetts, United States. Built in 1867, it was the world's shortest functioning suspension bridge before its conversion to a girder bridge in 1921.

A plaque reads, "Public Garden / Foot Bridge / Opened June 1, 1867 / Designers / Clemens Herschel, Civil Engineer / 1842 - 1930 / William G. Preston, Architect / 1842 - 1910 / Tablet Placed June 1, 1936 / Boston Society of Civil Engineers".

See also

List of bridges documented by the Historic American Engineering Record in Massachusetts

References

External links

Public Garden Footbridge, 1867, cultureNOW

1867 establishments in Massachusetts
Boston Public Garden
Bridges completed in 1867
Bridges in Boston
Historic American Engineering Record in Massachusetts
Pedestrian bridges in Massachusetts